Andrew Robert King, (born 1947) is a British astrophysicist and Professor of Astrophysics in the Department of Physics and Astronomy at the University of Leicester. His previous institutions include University College London and the Institute for Theoretical Physics at the University of Hamburg and a visiting position at the Observatoire de Paris. He currently holds visiting positions at the Astronomical Institute of the University of Amsterdam, and he is a Visiting Professor at Leiden University. He has served as Editor and now is Deputy Editor-in-Chief of the international astronomy journal Monthly Notices of the Royal Astronomical Society.

His research started with his PhD in relativistic cosmology, working with his supervisor George F. R. Ellis at the University of Cambridge. He also worked with Stephen Hawking. He has worked in the fields of General Relativity, binary star evolution, accretion discs and active galactic nuclei.

In 2014 he received the Eddington Medal of the Royal Astronomical Society "for investigations of outstanding merit in theoretical astrophysics".

Selected publications 
Books
  
  
 

Papers

References

External links 
 Faculty website

British astrophysicists
Living people
1947 births
Academic staff of the University of Hamburg
Alumni of the University of Cambridge